The 2013 Egypt Cup is the eighty-first season of the Egypt Cup since its establishment in 1921. A total of 48 teams contested for the Cup.

Round of 32

Round of 16

Quarterfinals

Semifinals

Final

References 
 https://int.soccerway.com/national/egypt/cup/2013/s8518/final-stages/

1
Egypt Cup
2012–13 in Egyptian football